The Shalyni barb (Pethia shalynius), is a species of cyprinid fish found in hill streams of Meghalaya, India,  A report from Assam may be mistaken.  This species grows to a length of  TL.  It is of minor importance to local commercial fisheries.

References 

Pethia
Barbs (fish)
Fish described in 1975